Veregava Ridge (‘Hrebet Veregava’ \'hre-bet ve-re-'ga-va\) is the ridge rising to 3210 m at Mount Waldron in the northeast foothills of Vinson Massif in Sentinel Range, Ellsworth Mountains in Antarctica. The feature extends 15.7 km in southwest–northeast direction and 6 km in southeast–northwest direction, and has its interior drained by Berisad Glacier and Orizari Glacier.  It is bounded by Dater Glacier to the west and north, and its tributary Hansen Glacier to the southeast, and separated from Doyran Heights to the south by Manole Pass.

The ridge is named after the eastern Balkan Mountains (old Bulgarian name Veregava).

Location
US mapping in 1961, updated in 1988.

Maps
 Vinson Massif.  Scale 1:250 000 topographic map.  Reston, Virginia: US Geological Survey, 1988.
 Antarctic Digital Database (ADD). Scale 1:250000 topographic map of Antarctica. Scientific Committee on Antarctic Research (SCAR). Since 1993, regularly updated.

Notes

Features
Geographical features include:

 Berisad Glacier
 Dater Glacier
 Hansen Glacier
 Kushla Peak
 Manole Pass
 Mount Waldron
 Orizari Glacier
 Parangalitsa Peak
 Sipey Bluff

References
 Veregava Ridge. SCAR Composite Antarctic Gazetteer.
 Bulgarian Antarctic Gazetteer. Antarctic Place-names Commission. (details in Bulgarian, basic data in English)

External links
 Veregava Ridge. Copernix satellite image

Ridges of Ellsworth Land
Bulgaria and the Antarctic